Ahmad Nawaf Abdelaziz Sariweh is a Jordanian footballer who plays as a midfielder for Al-Wehdat.  
 
Sariweh has two brothers; an older brother named Abdel-Aziz and a younger one named Osama.

International career
Sariweh's first match with the Jordan national senior team was against Kuwait on 9 October 2013 in an international friendly which resulted in a 1-1 draw for both teams.

International goals

With U-19

With U-23

None-International goals

References

External links
 
 

Living people
Jordanian footballers
Jordan international footballers
Association football forwards
Al-Wehdat SC players
Al-Salt SC players
Al-Faisaly SC players
Sahab SC players
Al-Qadsiah FC players
Al-Orobah FC players
Jordanian people of Palestinian descent
1994 births
2015 AFC Asian Cup players
Footballers at the 2014 Asian Games
Sportspeople from Amman
Saudi First Division League players
Expatriate footballers in Saudi Arabia
Asian Games competitors for Jordan
Jordanian Pro League players
Jordanian expatriate footballers
Jordanian expatriate sportspeople in Saudi Arabia